Swallowtail may refer to:
 Swallowtail catastrophe or swallowtail surface, a singularity occurring in the part of mathematics called catastrophe theory
 Swallow-tail coat, a formal tailcoat worn traditionally as part of the white tie dress code
 Swallowtail butterfly, large colorful butterflies from the family Papilionidae
 Swallowtail (film), 1996 film directed by Shunji Iwai
 Swallowtail (flag), a term in vexillology
 Swallowtail joint in woodworking, see Dovetail joint
 The Swallow's Tail, a painting by Salvador Dalí, inspired by the swallowtail catastrophe
 Swallowtail, a butler café in Tokyo, Japan
 Swallowtail, a Wolf Alice song from their debut album My Love Is Cool

See also
 Swallowtail Butterfly (Ai no Uta), the theme song for the film Swallowtail